Isabel Meyrelles (born 1929) is a Portuguese surrealist sculptor and poet.

Born in Matosinhos, Meyrelles set up the Portuguese Surrealist group in Lisbon after meeting Mario Cesariny and Artur do Cruzeiro in 1949. She studied sculpture with Americo Gomes and Antonio Duarte before moving to Paris where she studied at the Sorbonne and the Ecole des Beaux-Arts.

Poetry
 Em voz baixa (In a Low Voice), 1951
 Palavras Nocturnas (Night Words), 1954
 (ed.) Anthologie de poesie portugaise, 1971
 (trans.) Labyrinth du chant by Mário Cesariny de Vasconcelos
 O Rostro Deserto, 1966

References

1929 births
Living people
People from Matosinhos
20th-century Portuguese women artists
20th-century Portuguese women writers
20th-century Portuguese poets
21st-century Portuguese women artists
21st-century Portuguese women writers
21st-century Portuguese poets
Portuguese women sculptors
Portuguese women poets
Portuguese surrealist writers
Portuguese surrealist artists
Women surrealist artists
Portuguese–French translators